Halmstad BTK is a table tennis club in Halmstad, Sweden. Established on 27 October 1937, the club won the Swedish national men's team championship in 1993 and 2003 and the Swedish women's national team championship in 1991, 1992, 1995 and 1996. Jörgen Persson and Åsa Svensson have played for the club.

References

External links
Official website 

1937 establishments in Sweden
Sport in Halmstad
Sports clubs established in 1937
Table tennis clubs in Sweden